Banger Patler is 1993 Tulu Language film. It was produced and directed by Dr. Richard Castelino, and shot by cinematographer Sundarnath Suvarna. The musical score is by Ragdev. The film stars Vaman Raj in the title role, with supporting roles by Sudha Rani, Kasargod Chinna, Sarojini Shetty, Sundeep Malani, Rohidas Kadri and others. It was shot in and around Mangalore. The film ran for 105 days in Jyothi Talkies, Mangalore. It was the first Tulu cinema which won national award.

List of Tulu movies
List of tulu films of 2015
List of Tulu films of 2014
List of Released Tulu films
Tulu cinema

References

1993 films
Tulu-language films
Films shot in Mangalore